Brittany Vise (born October 27, 1987 in Colorado Springs, Colorado, United States) is a retired American pair skater who also competed as a single skater. For most of her career, she competed with Nicholas Kole. They broke up following the 2005/2006 season. From 1998-1999, she competed with Jeremy Abbott. Her older sister Tiffany Vise is also a competitive skater.

Vise & Kole had a lot of success on the junior level, winning five medals on the Junior Grand Prix, including the silver medal at the 2005 Junior Grand Prix Final. They placed sixth at the 2004 World Junior Figure Skating Championships. They competed three times as seniors on the Grand Prix circuit. Their highest placement was 5th at the 2005 NHK Trophy. Vise & Kole announced the end of their partnership on March 6, 2006.

Results

Ladies' Singles

Pairs
(with Kole)

 N = Novice level; J = Junior level

External links
 
 Unseen Skaters profile

American female pair skaters
1987 births
Living people
Figure skaters from Colorado Springs, Colorado
21st-century American women
20th-century American women